The Kerikeri River rises in the Puketi Forest inland from Kerikeri and flows into the western extremity of the Bay of Islands in northern New Zealand.

The freshwater river falls over a ford into the Kerikeri Basin, the upper extremity of Kerikeri Inlet, a northwestern arm of the Bay. The ford replaced a bridge which crossed at that point for decades, but which needed to be demolished to protect Kerikeri's historic buildings in the basin.

A replacement bypass bridge was constructed several hundred metres upstream and opened in 2008.

The area is one of the most visited tourist destinations in the country, because of its history and photogenic buildings. The Stone Store was built in 1832 and is the oldest stone building extant in New Zealand. Adjacent is the Mission House, previously known as "Kemp House", which was built in 1822 and is the oldest surviving wooden house in Australia and New Zealand. Behind, up a hill, is St James' Church which has been on the site since 1829 (although in its current form only since 1878).

Hongi used the river and tracks beside it to commute to Kororipo, his coastal pa, which played a significant part in the historic Musket Wars.

A popular walking track from the basin leads about five kilometres to the river’s spectacular Rainbow Falls. One of the first hydroelectric power stations in New Zealand was constructed on the river, and remains of it can be seen from the track.

References

Far North District
Rivers of the Northland Region
Bay of Islands
Rivers of New Zealand